This article provides details of international football games played by the El Salvador national football team from 1970 to 1979.

1970

1971

1972

1974

1976

1977

1979

References 

El Salvador national football team